Bandy Creek is a north-eastern suburb of Esperance, a town in south-eastern Western Australia.

References

Suburbs of Esperance, Western Australia